The 21st Battalion (Eastern Ontario), CEF was an infantry battalion of the Canadian Expeditionary Force in the Great War.

History 
The battalion was authorized on 7 November 1914 and embarked for Britain on 6 May 1915. It disembarked in France on 15 September 1915, where it fought as part of the 4th Canadian Brigade, 2nd Canadian Division in France and Flanders. The battalion was disbanded on 30 August 1920.

The 21st Battalion recruited in Eastern Ontario and was mobilized at Kingston, Ontario.

Officers Commanding
The 21st Battalion had five Officers Commanding:
Lt.-Col. William St Pierre Hughes, 6 May 1915 – 18 July 1916
Lt.-Col. E.W. Jones, DSO, 18 July 1916 – 7 January 1917
Lt.-Col. Thomas F. Elmitt, 7 January 1917 – 1 July 1917
Lt.-Col. Elmer Watson Jones, DSO, 1 July 1917 – 8 August 1918
Lt.-Col. H.E. Pense, DSO, 8 August 1918-Demobilization

The Ottawa Branch of the 21st Battalion Association erected a memorial plaque at St. Andrew's Presbyterian Church (Ottawa) which is dedicated to Brigadier General William St Pierre Hughes, DSO, VD, first Commanding Officer of the battalion.

Perpetuation 
The 21st Battalion (Eastern Ontario), CEF, is perpetuated by The Princess of Wales' Own Regiment.

Battle honours
The 21st Battalion was awarded the following battle honours:

Mont Sorrel
Somme, 1916 & 1918
Flers-Courcelette
Thiepval
Ancre Heights
Arras, 1917 & 1918
Vimy Ridge, 1917
Hill 70
Passchendaele
Amiens
Scarpe, 1918
Drocourt-Quéant
Hindenburg Line
Canal du Nord
Cambrai, 1918
Pursuit to Mons
France & Flanders, 1915-18

Media
Capt. Herbert W. McBride, who served with the 21st Battalion, wrote two books about his experiences as a member of the unit during the Great War as a sniper and machine gunner: "A Rifleman Went To War" and "The Emma Gees."

Notable members 

 Frank McGee

See also 
 List of infantry battalions in the Canadian Expeditionary Force

References

Sources
 Canadian Expeditionary Force 1914-1919 by Col. G.W.L. Nicholson, CD, Queen's Printer, Ottawa, Ontario, 1962
 A Rifleman Went To War, by Capt. Herbert W. McBride, MM, Small Arms Technical Publishing Company 1935, 
 The Emma Gees, by Capt. Herbert W. McBride, MM, The Bobbs-Merrill Company Publishers, 1918, ISBN

External links

 http://21stbattalion.ca

021
Military units and formations of Ontario